The Intergovernmental Organisation for International Carriage by Rail (OTIF , from), is an intergovernmental organisation that governs international rail transport. As of 2019, 51 European, African, and Near Eastern states are members of OTIF. M. Wolfgang Küpper has been the Secretary general since April 2019.

OTIF deploys tools to facilitate international rail traffic and works closely together to achieve this with the International Rail Transport Committee (CIT), the United Nations Economic Commission for Europe (UNECE), the European Union Agency for Railways (ERA), the European Commission's Directorate-General for Mobility and Transport (DG MOVE), and the Organization for Cooperation of Railways (OSJD).

History 
OTIF was organised on 1 May 1985 pursuant to the Convention concerning International Carriage by Rail (COTIF), which was concluded in 1980. The predecessor of OTIF was the Central Office for International Carriage by Rail (OCTI), which was organised in 1893.

COTIF was modified by a Protocol signed in Vilnius on 3 June 1999. Prior to the Vilnius Protocol, the principal objective of OTIF was to develop uniform systems of law which could apply to the carriage of passengers and freight in international rail traffic. These systems of law have been in existence for decades and are known as the Uniform Rules Concerning the Contract of International Carriage of Goods by Rail (CIM) for freight/goods  and the Uniform Rules concerning the Contract of International Carriage of Passengers by Rail (CIV) for passengers.

Membership 

As of 2019, there are 50 Member States and 1 Associate Member of OTIF plus the European Union: Afghanistan, Albania, Algeria, Austria, Armenia, Azerbaijan, Belgium, Bosnia and Herzegovina, Bulgaria, Croatia, Czech Republic, Denmark, Estonia, European Union, Finland, France, Georgia, Germany, Greece, Hungary, Iran, Iraq, Ireland, Italy, Jordan, Latvia, Lebanon, Liechtenstein, Lithuania, Luxembourg, Monaco, Montenegro, Morocco, Netherlands, North Macedonia, Norway, Pakistan, Poland, Portugal, Romania, Russia, Serbia, Slovak Republic, Slovenia, Spain, Sweden, Switzerland, Syria, Tunisia, Turkey, Ukraine and United Kingdom.

Suspended 
The membership of Iraq, Lebanon and Syria have been suspended until international railway traffic with these countries is restored.

Associates 
Jordan has been an associate member since 1 August 2010. Associate membership limits Jordan's participation to observer status, without the right to vote.

The headquarters and organs 
The headquarters of OTIF are in Berne, Switzerland. Its organs are the General Assembly, the Administrative Committee as the financial and administrative supervisory body, the Revision Committee, the Committee of Experts on the Transport of Dangerous Goods, the Committee of Technical Experts and the Rail Facilitation Committee. The Secretary General provides the secretariat services. The working languages of the Organisation are English, French and German.

Activities 
Further development of rail transport law in the following areas:
 contracts of carriage for the international carriage of passengers and goods (CIV and CIM),
 carriage of dangerous goods (RID),
 contracts of use of vehicles (CUV),
 contract on the use of railway infrastructure (CUI),
 validation of technical standards and adoption of uniform technical prescriptions for railway material (APTU),
 procedure for the technical admission of railway vehicles and other railway material used in international traffic (ATMF);
Widening the scope of COTIF in order to make possible in the longer term through carriage by rail under a single legal regime from the Atlantic to the Pacific;
Preparing for the entry into force of the Luxembourg Protocol (Registry for International Interests in railway rolling stock, Secretariat of the Supervisory Authority);
The removal of obstacles to the crossing of frontiers in international rail transport;
Participation in the preparation of other international conventions concerning rail transport within UN/ECE and other international organisations.

See also 
 Organization for Cooperation of Railways

References

External links 
 http://www.otif.org Official web-site of the Intergovernmental Organisation for International Carriage by Rail

International rail transport organizations
Organizations established in 1985
International law organizations
Intergovernmental organizations established by treaty
Organisations based in Bern